Martyrs' Shrine is a Roman Catholic church in Midland, Ontario.

Martyrs' Shrine may also refer to:

Taiwan
 Hualien Martyrs' Shrine in Hualien
 Kaohsiung Martyrs' Shrine in Kaohsiung
 National Revolutionary Martyrs' Shrine in Taipei
 Taichung Martyrs' Shrine in Taichung
 Taoyuan Martyrs' Shrine in Taoyuan

Other uses
 Munyonyo Martyrs' Shrine, in Munyonyo, Kampala, Uganda
 National Shrine of the North American Martyrs in Auriesville, New York, United States